Sergey Chumakov may refer to:
 Sergey Chumakov (canoeist)
 Sergey Chumakov (singer)